Nisreen Shocair (born 1973) is the President of Virgin Megastore Middle East and North Africa as well as a TV personality.

Early life 
Born in 1973 in Lagos, Nigeria where her father owned a pharmaceutical company. Her interest in entertainment began when her brothers would bring her copies of British music magazines and vinyl records on their visits from their boarding schools in England. Nisreen is an MBA graduate from London Business School and Columbia University in New York with global study programs in Chile and Argentina

Career 
Nisreen has held various positions within the music publishing, licensing, digital entertainment and retail industries at Sony Music, Bertelsmann AG and Hearst Entertainment in United States, UK and Germany. She is a co-founder of Collage Foundation, the brainchild of model Angela Lindvall, aimed at enabling youth’s participation in sustainability projects within their communities and schools, providing them with a platform to share ideas.

In 2006, Nisreen joined Virgin Megastore Middle East And North Africa, a division of Azadea Group Holding. Under her new direction, the corporation has grown both vertically and horizontality throughout the Arab World.

In 2012, Shocair appeared in The Entrepreneur, a reality TV show produced by Du as the judge. Nisreen is on the advisory board of several digital and environmental start-ups. She is a YPO and YAL member and is a frequent Guest lecturer on retail excellence, customer experience, innovation, entrepreneurship at universities and corporate retreats such as Nestle, GM, London Business School, Columbia University, Retail Week and Women in Leadership.

Awards and recognition 
 2014 Blue Ocean Retail Brilliance Awards

References 

1973 births
Living people
Alumni of London Business School
Columbia Business School alumni
Nigerian television personalities